The Robert Henne House is  a historic building located in the West End of Davenport, Iowa, United States. This Greek Revival style residence was built for Robert and Henrietta Henne in 1874. He operated the cigar stand in the post office. She continued the business after his death in 1885. The house followed a popular 19th-century style in Davenport that has some unique features. The gable-end oculus is located on the side of the house as opposed to the front. On the front are a pair of round-arch windows. The windows that face the front of the house feature keystone window heads that drop to small molded corner blocks and are flush to the brick. Molded panels are found on the porch frieze and on the soffits and reveals on the main entrance. The house has been listed on the National Register of Historic Places since 1983.

References

Houses completed in 1874
Greek Revival houses in Iowa
Houses in Davenport, Iowa
Houses on the National Register of Historic Places in Iowa
National Register of Historic Places in Davenport, Iowa